The 2016–17 Combined Counties Football League season (known as the 2016–17 Cherry Red Records Combined Counties Football League for sponsorship reasons) was the 39th in the history of the Combined Counties Football League, a football competition in England.

The league constitution was announced on 17 May 2016. 
The season began on 2 August and concluded in May 2017.

Premier Division

The Premier Division was increased from 22 to 23 clubs, and featured five new teams after the promotion of Ashford Town to the Southern League, and the relegation of Chessington & Hook United, Cove and Redhill to Division One:

Abbey Rangers, promoted as third-placed club in Division One.
Bedfont & Feltham, promoted as runners-up in Division One.
CB Hounslow United, promoted as champions of Division One.
Walton & Hersham, relegated from the Isthmian League.

In June 2016, North Greenford United, relegated from the Southern Football League, successfully appealed against their placement in the Hellenic Football League following relegation from the Southern Football League, and were placed in the Combined Counties Premier Division.

Camberley Town, Epsom & Ewell, Hartley Wintney, Walton & Hersham and Westfield applied for promotion to Step 4 for 2017–18.

League table

Division One

Division One was increased from 17 to 18 clubs, and featured six new teams after CB Hounslow United, Bedfont & Feltham and Abbey Rangers were promoted to the Premier Division, Dorking Wanderers Reserves left the league, and Sandhurst Town transferred to the Hellenic League:

AC London, transferred from the Kent Invicta League.
Bagshot, promoted from the Aldershot & District League.
Balham, promoted from the Surrey Elite Intermediate League.
Chessington & Hook United, relegated from the Premier Division.
Cove, relegated from the Premier Division.
Redhill, relegated from the Premier Division.
Reserve sides are not eligible for promotion to Step 5.

The season began on 6 August 2016 with Ash United and Frimley Green accruing the first points on the board with a 1–1 draw at Young's Drive, Ash. Frimley Green were deducted the point they earned from this match when it transpired that they had fielded an ineligible player.

Two matches remained unplayed because the visiting clubs were unable to raise teams.

League table

References

External links
 Combined Counties League Official Site

2016-17
9